John Furner is an American business executive. He is president and CEO of Walmart U.S. Previously, he led Walmart's Sam's Club subsidiary.

Early life and education
Furner was born in 1974 in Jacksonville, Arkansas. He attended university at the University of Arkansas, Fayetteville, where he studied marketing management. Furner graduated from the Sam M. Walton College of Business in 1996.

Career
Furner began his career at Walmart in 1993 as an hourly store associate. He later became a store manager, district manager, and buyer. He became CEO of Sam's Club on Feb. 1, 2017, after serving as Sam's Club's chief merchandising officer and, prior that, spending nearly three years in Walmart's international division as EVP of merchandising and marketing for Walmart China. At Sam's Club, Furner closed 63 stores to better compete with Costco. The Wall Street Journal reported that sales increased during his time as CEO. Based on his experience at Walmart China, Furner focused on increasing the use of technology in Sam's Club warehouses and narrowing its targeted customer. Furner also focused on increasing Sam's Club's private brand business.

Furner became president and CEO of Walmart U.S. in November 2019.

Personal life
Furner is married with four children. He is board chairman of the National Retail Federation and was a board member of Medal of Honor Foundation in 2020.

References

Living people
1974 births
Walmart people
People from Jacksonville, Arkansas
University of Arkansas alumni
Businesspeople from Arkansas
21st-century American businesspeople
American retail chief executives
20th-century American businesspeople